Olive Hill Airport , also known as Sellers' Field, is a city-owned, public-use airport located three nautical miles (6 km) southeast of the central business district of Olive Hill, a city in Carter County, Kentucky, United States.

Facilities and aircraft
The airport covers an area of 31 acres (13 ha) at an elevation of 1,030 feet (314 m) above mean sea level. It has one runway designated 2/20 with an asphalt surface measuring 2,500 by 50 feet (762 x 15 m).

For the 12-month period ending September 27, 2010, the airport had 50 general aviation aircraft operations. At that time there were 3 aircraft based at this airport, all single-engine.

References

External links
 Aerial image as of March 1995 from USGS The National Map
 

Defunct airports in the United States
Airports in Kentucky
Buildings and structures in Carter County, Kentucky
Transportation in Carter County, Kentucky